Karthik Raman (born 7 April 1997) is an Indian cricketer. He made his first-class debut for Andhra in the 2016–17 Ranji Trophy on 27 October 2016.

References

External links
 

1997 births
Living people
Indian cricketers
Andhra cricketers
People from East Godavari district